The 2016 Iowa Republican presidential caucuses took place on February 1 in the U.S. state of Iowa, traditionally marking the Republican Party's first nominating contest in their series of presidential primaries ahead of the 2016 presidential election.

The Democratic Party held its own Iowa caucuses on the same day.

Ted Cruz was able to defeat Donald Trump in the Iowa Caucus by winning over Evangelical caucus-goers; Cruz won 51,666 caucus votes or 27.6%, giving him a net gain of one delegate over Trump. Cruz visited all 99 counties of Iowa and held small events. Cruz outperformed his polling average, which predicted a narrow Trump victory in the caucus. 

Following poor performances in the caucuses, Rand Paul, Mike Huckabee and Rick Santorum suspended their campaigns.

Procedure
According to the Republican Party of Iowa's bylaws, if more than one candidate is nominated at the Republican National Convention, all of Iowa's delegates are bound to vote "proportionally in accordance with the outcome of the Iowa Caucuses" on the first ballot, even if the candidate has withdrawn from the race.
The ballot is a blank piece of paper, and the candidates that voters may vote for in the non-binding preference poll included the following:

 Jeb Bush
 Ben Carson
 Chris Christie
 Ted Cruz
 Carly Fiorina
 Jim Gilmore
 John Kasich
 Marco Rubio
 Donald Trump
 Rand Paul
 Rick Santorum
 Mike Huckabee

Forums and debates

November 20, 2015 – Des Moines, Iowa
The Presidential Family Forum was held in the Community Choice Credit Union Convention Center in Des Moines, Iowa. Ben Carson, Ted Cruz, Carly Fiorina, Mike Huckabee, Rand Paul, Marco Rubio, and Rick Santorum attended the forum hosted by evangelical Christian advocacy group The Family Leader. It was hosted by politician and political activist Bob Vander Plaats and moderated by political consultant and pollster Frank Luntz. Protesters interrupted the beginning of the event and were removed by police.

January 28, 2016 – Des Moines, Iowa
The seventh debate  was the second debate to air on Fox News. As in Fox's first debate, the moderators were Bret Baier, Megyn Kelly, and Chris Wallace. This was the last debate before actual voting began with the Iowa caucuses on February 1, 2016. Due to personality conflicts with Fox News, Donald Trump opted out of the debate.

Endorsements 

Source:

Polling

Aggregate polls

Results

Controversy

Ben Carson accused Ted Cruz's campaign of winning the caucuses using dishonest tactics, such as falsely telling caucus-goers that Carson had dropped out in order to get them to switch their votes to Cruz. Donald Trump also accused Cruz of "stealing" the Iowa caucuses through fraud.

Exit Polls

See also
 2016 Iowa Democratic presidential caucuses

References

External links
 RNC 2016 Republican Nominating Process
 Green papers for 2016 primaries, caucuses, and conventions
 Decision Desk Headquarter Results for Iowa

2016
Iowa
Republican caucuses
February 2016 events in the United States